RSI may refer to:

Broadcasting services
 Radio Singapore International, a former radio broadcaster in Singapore
 Radio Slovenia International, the international service of Slovenian state radio
 Radiotelevisione svizzera di lingua italiana, a Swiss radio and television broadcaster

Computing
 RSI register, a 64-bit processor register of x86 CPUs
 Relational Semantics, Inc., an American software company

Finance
Relative strength index, a technical indicator used in the analysis of financial markets
 Revenue and Social Insurance number, an identifier used for tax and welfare purposes in Ireland

Medicine and psychology
 Rapid sequence induction, a method of emergency intubation, involving paralytics and sedation
 Repetitive strain injury, a disorder affecting muscles, tendons and nerves from repetitive movements, forceful exertions, vibrations, mechanical compression, or sustained/awkward positions
 Residual self image, the concept that individuals tend to think of themselves as projecting a certain physical appearance
 The Real, The Symbolic, and The Imaginary, a theory in Lacanian psychoanalysis concerning human perception of reality

Physics
 RSI-value, a measure of how well a two-dimensional barrier resists the conductive flow of heat
 Review of Scientific Instruments, a scientific journal

Other organisations
RSI Corporation, an American safety compliance consulting firm
RADARSAT International, a provider of data and information derived from the Canadian RADARSAT satellite program overseen
 Red Sports International, an international sports organization supported by the Communist International
 Research Science Institute, an international summer research program for high school students
 Religious Science International, a religious organization

Other uses
 Ṛṣi, a term for an accomplished and enlightened person in Hinduism and Buddhism
 Regional Snowfall Index, a system used to assess the impact of winter storms in the United States
 Italian Social Republic or Repubblica Sociale Italiana, a puppet state of Nazi Germany during the later part of World War II